Mush is a type of cornmeal pudding (or porridge) which is usually boiled in water or milk. It is often allowed to set, or gel into a semisolid, then cut into flat squares or rectangles, and pan fried. Usage is especially common in the eastern and southeastern United States. It is customary in the midwestern United States to eat it with maple syrup or molasses. In Eastern Europe, milk is poured over the meal once served and cooled down, rather than being boiled in it. Cornmeal mush is often consumed in Latin America and Africa.

See also

 Cornbread
 Grits
 Gruel
 Hasty pudding
 Hominy
 Hushpuppy
 Johnnycake
 List of maize dishes
 List of porridges
 Mămăligă
 Polenta
 Pudding corn
 Samp
 Ugali

References
 
 
 

Cuisine of the Southern United States
Maize dishes
Porridges